The Golden Key may refer to:

Film
 The Golden Key (1939 film), a Soviet fantasy film directed by Aleksandr Ptushko
 The Golden Key (2001 film), a Vietnamese romantic war film directed by Lê Hoàng

Literature
 "The Golden Key" (Grimm's Fairy Tales), a fairy tale
 The Golden Key (MacDonald book), an 1867 fairy tale by George MacDonald
 The Golden Key (novel), a 1996 fantasy novel by Jennifer Roberson, Melanie Rawn, and Kate Elliott
 The Golden Key, or the Adventures of Buratino, a 1936 book by Aleksey Nikolayevich Tolstoy
 "The Golden Key", a religious pamphlet by Emmet Fox

See also
 Les Clefs d'Or (lit. The Golden Keys), a professional association of hotel concierges
 Golden key (disambiguation)